Ryan Clint Nece (born February 24, 1979) is a former American football linebacker who played in the National Football League. He was signed by the Tampa Bay Buccaneers as an undrafted free agent in 2002. He played college football at UCLA.
Nece is the son of Pro Football Hall of Fame safety Ronnie Lott.

Nece is a community activist involved in many charities throughout the Tampa Bay area.  He is on the board of the Tampa Bay Sports Authority and Tampa's Lowry Park Zoo. In 2006, he created his own foundation "The Ryan Nece Foundation", funding programs for youth and families. He is the co-founder and managing partner at Next Play Capital.

College career
Nece graduated from the University of California at Los Angeles (UCLA) and was a four-year starter for the Bruins and finished his career with 281 career tackles (173 solo), with 22 tackles for loss and 10 sacks.  He started out in his redshirt year as a safety but converted to linebacker afterwards.  He was an honorable mention All-Pac-10 selection and Butkus Award semifinalist as a senior at UCLA.

Professional career

Tampa Bay Buccaneers
Nece tore his ACL in his rookie year, ending his season after being a stalwart special teams tackler throughout the season.  In 2003, Nece moved into the starting spot across star linebacker Derrick Brooks and finished the season with 70 tackles and one interception.

Nece was released by the Buccaneers during final cuts on August 30, 2008.

Detroit Lions
On August 31, 2008, Nece was signed by the Detroit Lions. The move reunited him with Lions head coach Rod Marinelli, who was an assistant coach for the Buccaneers during Nece's first four seasons in Tampa Bay. Nece was released by the Lions in the 2009 off-season.

With Marc Isenberg, Nece is the co-author of Go Pro Like a Pro, a small booklet from 2011 created for athletes, their parents, and others who influence, advise, and work on athletes’ behalf.

Broadcasting career
The United Football league announced on September 14, 2010 that Nece would be doing sideline reporting during live games on the Versus network.  He joined the Pac-12 Network as a sideline reporter and football analyst in 2012.

Personal life
Nece was raised by his parents, Ronnie Lott and Cathy Nece. His parents chose to give him his mother’s maiden name with the hopes he would create his own identity and would avoid expectations as the son of Ronnie Lott. Nece and Lott became the second father-and-son duo to both win a Super Bowl, joining Bob and Brian Griese.
Ryan is married to Willa Ford. They held a wedding ceremony in April 2015. In March 2016, it was announced that the couple was expecting their first child. In 2016, they welcomed a son.

References

External links
Detroit Lions bio
Tampa Bay Buccaneers bio

College football announcers
United Football League broadcasters
1979 births
Living people
Sportspeople from San Bernardino, California
American football linebackers
UCLA Bruins football players
Tampa Bay Buccaneers players
Detroit Lions players
Players of American football from California